Shaan is a 1980 Indian Hindi-language action film directed by Ramesh Sippy, produced by G.P. Sippy and written by Salim–Javed after the blockbuster success of their previous venture, Sholay. The film stars an ensemble cast of Sunil Dutt, Shashi Kapoor, Amitabh Bachchan, Shatrughan Sinha, Rakhee Gulzar, Parveen Babi, Bindiya Goswami, Johnny Walker and Kulbhushan Kharbanda. The plot focuses on Vijay (Bachchan) and Ravi (Kapoor) who swear to avenge their brother DSP Shiv Kumar's (Dutt) death along with Rakesh (Sinha), a circus performer who also has a connection with the killer Shakaal (Kharbanda).

The film was an average performer upon its initial release. However, it did good business during re-runs, and also obtained the services of Sholays music composer, R.D. Burman, whose songs bagged a Best Music nomination at Filmfare. Shaan was one of the last films to feature the vocals of Mohammed Rafi. The character of Shakaal was inspired from the Ernst Stavro Blofeld's character from the James Bond film series.

Plot 
DSP Shiv Kumar (Sunil Dutt) returns home to his wife Sheetal (Rakhee Gulzar) and their young daughter Guddi and announces that he has been transferred to Mumbai. He has two younger brothers Vijay (Amitabh Bachchan) and Ravi (Shashi Kapoor) who live in Mumbai but spend their time loafing about the city and conning unsuspecting people. After being swindled by a beautiful, young girl Renu (Bindiya Goswami) and her uncle Chacha (Johnny Walker), Vijay and Ravi decide to join forces with them along with another glamorous thief Sunita (Parveen Babi). However, one of their tricks backfires and lands up Vijay and Ravi in prison. Nevertheless, Shiv arrives in Mumbai with Sheetal and Guddi and bails them out, hoping to shape them into a honorable life. 

Meanwhile, a mysterious man (Shatrughan Sinha) tries to shoot Shiv twice in the city, but Shiv survives both the attempts. Due to this shocking incident, Vijay and Ravi advise Shiv to find a different line of work, arguing that his current profession is unsuitable, dangerous and unpredictable for a family man. However, Shiv stands firm by citing his undying patriotic commitment to his corps and his country. It eventually turns out that the mysterious man was working for Shakaal (Kulbhushan Kharbanda), a sadistic international crime lord who is operating from a remote island outside India, while funding crime in Mumbai through his henchmen and rejoicing in pain of his enemies and traitors. 

Due to the fact that Shiv is getting closer to finding out the source of crime in Mumbai, Shakaal has his henchmen capture Shiv and bring him to his island. At his island, Shakaal influences Shiv to join his criminal forces in exchange of much wealth for a living. Shiv refuses to perform the wrongdoings and escapes from the island, managing to save his life from the wild dogs sent by Shakaal as well. However, Shiv is spotted at the nearby beach by Shakaal who shoots him fatally from a helicopter and has his body dumped back to Mumbai. 

As Vijay, Ravi and Sheetal lament the tragic loss of Shiv, the mysterious man approaches them and introduces himself as Rakesh, a marksman and former circus performer who used to shoot targets blindfolded. Rakesh confesses that he was blackmailed to kill Shiv by Shakaal who held his wife hostage, and that he deliberately missed on the two previous attempts in hopes of buying time to save his wife. However, Shakaal had already deduced this and arranged Rakesh's wife to be killed in a car accident. Upon learning this, Vijay and Ravi ally with Rakesh and they plan to defeat Shakaal's underworld together in revenge of their family members' death. 

To that end, the trio seek the aid of a legless beggar Abdul (Mazhar Khan) who provides them information about Shakaal's warehouse in Mumbai. Even though the trio succeed in destroying the warehouse, Shakaal retaliates by having his henchmen trace Abdul and kill him. However, Vijay sets things right by fighting against Shakaal's henchmen over Abdul's death at a local bar. This compels Shakaal to decide to play his next move in order to make the trio suffer a lot to death. As per his new plan, Shakaal has his henchmen abduct Sheetal and holds her captive at his island. 

Though it would have appeared that the trio are able to concede defeat over Sheetal's imminent fate, they are approached by one of Shakaal's aides Jagmohan (Mac Mohan) who offers them his help to gain entry at Shakaal's island as he was brutally injured by Shakaal for his previous failure. Posing as a dance troupe, the trio (along with Sunita, Renu and Chacha) enter the island and perform for Shakaal, who later captures them all and reveals that he had only sent Jagmohan (who was faking his injuries) to trap them. However, Chacha creates a commotion that allows the trio to be freed and kill Jagmohan and the rest of Shakaal's henchmen. 

Later, the trio arrive at the scene where Sheetal is imprisoned but Shakaal has Vijay thrown in a pool that contains a man-eating crocodile while he intends to kill Ravi and Rakesh himself. Killing the crocodile, Vijay exits the pool and helps Ravi and Rakesh defend themselves from Shakaal. Just as the trio finally manage to capture Shakaal and are about to kill him, Sheetal intervenes and refuses to let them, pointing out that doing so can be disrespectful to the law that Shiv upholds. The arguing commotion allows Shakaal to free himself and attempt to kill Sheetal, forcing the trio to fatally shoot him down in defense. However, Shakaal slyly sets the island to self-destruct before he dies. Despite this, the trio, Sunita, Renu, Sheetal and Chacha are able to escape on a helicopter to safety, satisfied that they have beaten Shakaal in his tracks for good.

Cast 
 Sunil Dutt as DSP Shiv Kumar
 Shashi Kapoor as Ravi Kumar
 Amitabh Bachchan as Vijay Kumar
 Shatrughan Sinha as Rakesh
 Rakhee Gulzar as Sheetal
 Parveen Babi as Sunita
 Bindiya Goswami as Renu
 Johnny Walker as Chacha 
 Kulbhushan Kharbanda as Shakaal
 Mac Mohan as Jagmohan (Shakaal's aide) 
 Mazhar Khan as Abdul (Vijay and Ravi's friend) 
 Padmini Kapila as Roma (Rakesh's wife)
 Bindu as Maharani in "Pyaar Karne Wale" song (Special Appearance) 
 Helen as Cabret Dancer in "Yamma Yamma" song (Special Appearance) 
 Yunus Parvez as Hotel Manager (Cameo Appearance) 
 Viju Khote as Police Inspector who chases Vijay and Sunita (Cameo Appearance)

Shakaal's henchmen 
 Sudhir as Ranjeet who is killed by Shakaal for his betrayal  
 Sudhir Pandey as Tiwari
 Dalip Tahil as Kumar
 Manik Irani as Goon
 Goga Kapoor as Goon  
 Sharat Saxena as Goon  
 Sujit Kumar as Goon

Production
Logistical issues relating to other projects in which the cast was involved meant that Shaan took three years to make. While Sholay drew its inspiration from the American Western and Spaghetti Western films, Shaan took its lead from the James Bond films with fancy sets and beautiful costumes. Shakaal, the bald villain (originally to be played by Sanjeev Kumar) played by Kulbhushan Kharbanda, was based on the James Bond villain, Blofeld.

A large golden eagle is prominent in Shakaal's island lair and in the Bollywood obligatory final song-and-dance. The eagle is reminiscent of the golden lamb in Cecile DeMille's Ten Commandments; construction on the golden eagle required outside experts to be flown in and cost, in Rupees, the equivalent of the chariot scene in Ben-Hur.

Sippy wanted to repeat the cast of Sholay for this film, but due to date issues, Sunil Dutt played the role initially offered to Sanjeev Kumar, Bindiya Goswami played the role initially offered to Hema Malini, and Shashi Kapoor was selected when Dharmendra declined to do the character of Ravi.

The film was set and partially filmed on the island of Steep Holm.

Parveen Babi suffered her first anxiety attack when she completed shooting the song "Pyar Karne Wale". Just after the shooting of that song, there was a scene in the film where Parveen Babi is inside the car and then Amitabh Bachchan gets in the car. The scene was later shot when Parveen Babi returned from the U.S. and she recommenced work by shooting this scene.

Soundtrack
The music was composed by R. D. Burman and the lyrics were penned by Anand Bakshi.

The version of the song "Yamma Yamma" is not the final recorded song, that is used in the movie. It was a rehearsed copy sung by Late Mohd Rafi, and the actual recording was scheduled for later, which was used by RD Burman in the movie due to the sudden untimely death of Mohd Rafi before the final recording. This is the only song where Mohd Rafi and RD Burman sing a duet together.

Box office
The film grossed 12.5 crores during its lifetime theatrical run. Adjusted for inflation, the film has grossed 271 crores ($33 million) as of 2023.

Awards

 28th Filmfare Awards:

Won

 Best Cinematography – S. M. Anwar

Nominated

 Best Music Director – R. D. Burman

References

External links
 

1980 films
1980s Hindi-language films
Films directed by Ramesh Sippy
Films scored by R. D. Burman
Indian action films
Films with screenplays by Salim–Javed
1980s Urdu-language films
1980 action films
Hindi-language action films
Films about crocodilians
Urdu-language Indian films